Dewey Lake State Forest is a state forest in Floyd County, Kentucky, United States. The  forest is leased to the state of Kentucky by the United States Army Corps of Engineers. The forest is in proximity of Jenny Wiley State Resort Park.

References

Kentucky state forests
Protected areas of Floyd County, Kentucky